The fifth season of American talent show competition series America's Got Talent was broadcast on NBC from June 1 to September 15, 2010. For this season, production staff introduced two new quarter-finals: one for Wildcards selected from the participants eliminated during auditions or their respective quarter-final, and one for acts that auditioned via YouTube, following changes in the online application process. Following the conclusion of the fourth season, David Hasselhoff left the program, and was replaced by Howie Mandel.

The fifth season was won by soul singer Michael Grimm, with classical crossover singer Jackie Evancho finishing in second, and blacklight performaners Fighting Gravity placing third. During its broadcast, the season averaged around over 11 million viewers, with its season finale the most watched in the program's history with around 16.41 million viewers.

Season overview 

Auditions for the fifth season's competition took place during Winter until mid-Spring 2010. Auditions were filmed in Dallas, Los Angeles, New York, Portland, Chicago and at the Universal Orlando Resort. Prior to production starting, David Hasselhoff left the show to focus on a new project, leaving a replacement needed for his role as judge. A week after Hasselhoff announced his departure from AGT, the network unveiled his successor as Howie Mandel, who had recently finished his fourth season as host of the American edition of Deal or No Deal (before its eight-year hiatus began that year).

For this season, format changes included the addition of two new rounds in the quarter-finals. The first new round was arranged for online auditions, which in itself was modified in rules and arrangements. Prior to the fifth season, most online auditions were made via MySpace and did not guarantee that any submissions made would secure a place in the competition. However, these online applications were later changed so that applicants could submit recorded auditions on a special YouTube channel. Eleven acts were picked by the judges, while a twelfth would be selected by voting from online viewers, guaranteeing a place in the competition via a special quarter-final round. The second new round was a reformatting of the Wildcard system. Unlike the original format, the judges could each pick about four participants who were eliminated from the competition, either at the Vegas Verdicts stage or in the quarter-finals. The decision to include two new quarter-finals to the competition's schedule, meant that the number of quarter-finalists allowed to move on to the semi-finals, were reduced to around four from each quarter-final. The top three were voted on by the public, and the fourth was chosen by the judges from those placed fourth and fifth respectively, in the public vote.

Another change in the format was a deeper involvement of guest performers in America's Got Talent. While the program had mainly made use of them for entertainment during the Results episode aired after the Performance episodes in the previous season, additional guest performers became involved in the program after the rules on performances in the live grand-final were changed. Participants could each conduct a performance alongside a guest performer, with the choice determined by the type of act they performed. Despite arranging a variety of guest performers for this season, the involvement of Susan Boyle during the results of the Top 10 final was cancelled at the last minute, due to a legal complication securing the rights to a song by Lou Reed.

Of the participants who auditioned for this season, sixty-five secured a place in the live quarter-finals, with twelve quarter-finalists in each one. Seven of these would later be given a second chance in the Wildcard quarter-final, after losing their initial quarter-final. About twenty-four of these advanced and were split between the two semi-finals, with ten semi-finalists securing a place in the finals, and four finalists securing a place in the grand-final of the competition. The following below lists the results of each participant's overall performance in this season:

 |  |  |  | 
 |  Wildcard Quarter-finalist

  Ages denoted for a participant(s), pertain to their final performance for this season.
  These participants were entered into the Wildcard quarter-final after losing their initial quarter-final.
  For health and safety reasons, ArcAttack had to perform outside the studio for their live round performances; judges were required to view the performance in person, and used hand-carried signs in place of their buzzers.
  This participant was originally eliminated during the Vegas Verdicts, but was brought back after another act that had passed that stage was forced to drop out for unknown reasons.
  The age of the dog in this act was not disclosed on the program.
  This participant initially dropped out for personal reasons, despite securing a place in the live rounds, but agreed to return as a quarter-finalist in the Wildcard round.

Quarter-finals summary
 Buzzed Out |  Judges' choice | 
 |

Quarter-final 1 (July 13)
Guest Performers, Results Show: Selena Gomez & the Scene, and cast of Rock of Ages & Dee Snider

Quarter-final 2 (July 20)
Guest Performers, Results Show: Cast of Cirque Du Soleil, and cast of Train.

Quarter-final 3 (July 27)
Guest Performers, Results Show: Mike Posner, and the JabbaWockeeZ.

  Because of the majority vote for Jeremy VanSchoonhoven, Mandel's voting intention was not revealed.

Quarter-final 4 (August 3)
Guest Performers, Results Show: Taio Cruz, and Bret Michaels.

Quarter-final 5 - YouTube Round (August 10)
Guest Performers, Results Show: Lin Yu Chun, Evolution of Dance, and David & Dania.

Quarter-final 6 - Wildcard Round (August 17)
Guest Performers, Results Show: LeAnn Rimes, and Criss Angel.

Semi-finals summary
 Buzzed Out |  Judges' choice | 
 |

Semi-final 1 (August 24)
Guest Performers, Results Show: Jimmy Fallon, Kylie Minogue, and Recycled Percussion.

Semi-final 2 (August 31)
Guest Performers, Results Show: Cast of Le Rêve, and Jason Derülo.

  Due to the majority vote for Studio One Young Beast Society, Mandel's voting intention was not revealed.

Finals summary
 |  | 
 |

Final - Top 10 (September 7)
Guest Performers: Enrique Iglesias (Performance Episode); Sarah McLachlan, and cast of American Idiot (Results Show).

Grand-final (September 14)
Guest Performers, Results Show: Usher, the Goo Goo Dolls, cast of Cirque du Soleil, David Copperfield, and T-Pain.

Ratings 
The following ratings are based upon those published by Nielsen Media Research after this season's broadcast:

References

External links
Official NBC America's Got Talent website

2010 American television seasons
America's Got Talent seasons